Scott Sullivan may refer to:

Scott D. Sullivan, accountant and executive involved in the WorldCom scandal
Scott Sullivan (baseball) (born 1971), baseball pitcher
Scott Sullivan (politician), speaker pro tempore of the Arkansas House of Representatives